The Madison Municipal Building, also known as the United States Post Office and Federal Courthouse, is a historic government building at 215 Martin Luther King Junior Boulevard in Madison, Wisconsin. Built in 1927-29, the building was Madison's tenth main post office and the second courthouse for the United States District Court for the Western District of Wisconsin; it replaced an 1867 building which had also served as both post office and courthouse. James A. Wetmore, the Supervising Architect of the United States Treasury Department at the time, designed the Neoclassical building; the Neoclassical style was commonly used for post offices in the early twentieth century. The building has a limestone exterior with a two-story Ionic colonnade on its front facade, a central entrance with three doorways, and a cornice and parapet at its roof. When the post office relocated in 1980, the City of Madison moved its offices into the building and renamed it the Madison Municipal Building; the district court also relocated later in the 1980s.

The building was added to the National Register of Historic Places on November 27, 2002.

References

		
National Register of Historic Places in Madison, Wisconsin
Government buildings on the National Register of Historic Places in Wisconsin
Post office buildings on the National Register of Historic Places in Wisconsin
Government buildings completed in 1929
Neoclassical architecture in Wisconsin